Great Britain competed at the 2014 European Athletics Championships in Zürich, Switzerland, from 12–17 August 2014. British Athletics named a team of 74 athletes on 15 July 2014. Great Britain topped the medal table with their greatest gold medal haul in European Championships history. Adam Gemili won the nation's 100th gold medal in the history of the championships.

Medals

Results
Men

Track & road events

Field Events

Combined events – Decathlon

Women

Track & road events

Field Events

Key
Note–Ranks given for track events are within the athlete's heat only
Q = Qualified for the next round
q = Qualified for the next round as a fastest loser or, in field events, by position without achieving the qualifying target
NR = National record
N/A = Round not applicable for the event
Bye = Athlete not required to compete in round

References

Nations at the 2014 European Athletics Championships
Great Britain at the European Athletics Championships
European Athletics Championships